Sunday Side Up is a British talk show that has aired on ITV from 27 October to 29 December 2013 and was hosted by Stephen Mulhern.

External links

2013 British television series debuts
2013 British television series endings
English-language television shows
ITV (TV network) original programming
Television series by ITV Studios